Turunchuk River, also called New Dniester is a left branch of the Dniester River, which flows from Moldova to Ukraine, when inflows to the Dniester River near the city of Bilyayivka. The total length of the river is 60 km, width 30 m, depth up to 6 m, in some cases up to 9 m.

Sources

 Природа Приднестровской Молдавской Республики: Учебное пособие для учащихся 8 класса общеобразовательных школ ПМР / Сост. О. З. Лысенко. — Тирасполь, 2003. — 48 с.

0Turunchuk
Rivers of Transnistria
Rivers of Odesa Oblast
Moldova–Ukraine border
Geography of Odesa Raion